Cumian (lit. "thick noodles") are thick Chinese noodles made from wheat flour and water. Two types of Chinese noodles are called cumian. One is Shanghai style, thick in diameter, used in Shanghai fried noodles. The other type is Hong Kong style, flat and wide, sometimes yellow-alkaline. The flat cumian is a popular option in Hong Kong's cart noodles.

References

See also
Yi mein, dried wheat based egg noodles in Cantonese cuisine, some are flat
Garak-guksu, a thick wheat Korean noodle
Udon, a thick wheat Japanese noodle
Bánh canh, a thick tapioca Vietnamese noodle
Pici, a thick wheat noodle from Tuscany

Chinese noodles
Shanghai cuisine